The 2000 All-Ireland Senior Hurling Championship (also known as the Guinness Hurling Championship for sponsorship reasons) was the 114th staging of the All-Ireland Senior Hurling Championship, the Gaelic Athletic Association's premier inter-county hurling tournament. The draw for the 2000 fixtures took place on 14 November 1999. The championship began on 6 May 2000 and ended on 10 September 2000.

Cork were the defending champions but were defeated by Offaly in the All-Ireland semi-final. Carlow, New York and Westmeath fielded teams after long absences.

On 10 September 2000, Kilkenny won the championship following a 5-15 to 1-14 defeat of Offaly in the All-Ireland final. This was their 26th All-Ireland title, their first in seven championship seasons. It was the third All-Ireland final to feature teams from the same province.

Offaly's Johnny Dooley was the championship's top scorer with 0-41. Kilkenny's D. J. Carey was the unanimous choice for Hurler of the Year.

New provincial formats
Following a motion from the Westmeath County Board at Congress, the Leinster Council proposed the introduction of a "back door system" in their hurling championship. This would be introduced to help develop hurling in the "weaker" counties and to ensure at least two championship games for these teams. While the motion was passed at Congress in April, the new format was rejected by the GAA's management committee at a meeting on 30 October 1999. The committee disagreed with the prospect of allowing losers from earlier rounds to re-enter the championship through a "back door system". As a result of this the Leinster Council were forced to tweak their championship format. This also led to the postponement of the championship draw. The Leinster Council's diluted proposal saw the introduction of a round-robin for the four weakest teams in the province. The group stage winners would join the other three teams in the championship proper.

Teams
Due to the introduction of the round robin system in Leinster, Carlow and Westmeath returned to the championship.

On 18 May 2000 the Roscommon County Board announced that the senior hurling team were withdrawing from the Connacht Championship. Nine of the previous year's panel were absent and, together with a lack of commitment from the remaining players, the board were left with no choice but to withdraw. As a result of this the Connacht Championship was not played and Galway's first game was an All-Ireland quarter-final.

The Kerry County Board were faced with a similar prospect to Roscommon, however, they declined to withdraw from the Munster Championship.

New York joined the Ulster Championship.

Personnel and kits

Ulster Senior Hurling Championship

Munster Senior Hurling Championship

Leinster Senior Hurling Championship 

Knockout Stage

All-Ireland Senior Hurling Championship

Top scorers

Season

Single game

Clean sheets

References

Further reading
 Corry, Eoghan, The GAA Book of Lists (Hodder Headline Ireland, 2005).
 Donegan, Des, The Complete Handbook of Gaelic Games (DBA Publications Limited, 2005).
 Nolan, Pat, Flashbacks: A Half Century of Cork Hurling (The Collins Press, 2000).

External links
All-Ireland Senior Hurling Championship 2000 Results

All-Ireland Senior Hurling Championships
All-Ireland Senior Hurling Championship